P1000 may refer to:

Landkreuzer P. 1000 Ratte, a design for a super-heavy tank for use by Nazi Germany during World War II
P-1000 Vulkan, an anti-ship cruise missile of the Soviet Union
Samsung P1000 Galaxy Tab, a mini-tablet computer
Nikon Coolpix P1000, a camera